Poselli is a surname. Notable people with the surname include:

Giacomo Poselli (1922-2007), Albanian footballer
Vitaliano Poselli (1838–1918), Italian architect